Caleb Daniels (born May 17, 1999) is an American college basketball player for the Villanova Wildcats of the Big East Conference. He previously played for the Tulane Green Wave.

High school career
Daniels attended St. Augustine High School in New Orleans, Louisiana. He averaged 20 points per game as a junior. As a senior, he averaged 19 points and 12 rebounds per game, leading the Purple Knights to the Division I semifinals. Daniels was selected to the All-Metro team by The Times-Picayune. He was named to the second team all-state in the Louisiana Sports Writers Association Class 5A, and he was voted Most Valuable Player in the Catholic League. In April 2017, Daniels committed to playing college basketball for Tulane over offers from Louisiana-Lafayette, New Orleans, Texas State, Rice, VCU, and UNC Asheville. He was the valedictorian of his class, and his speech spoke of a brotherhood at the high school and quoted Harriet Tubman.

College career
Daniels averaged 6.4 points, 2.2 rebounds, and 1.5 assists per game as a freshman. On March 9, 2019, he scored a career-high 36 points in a 82–79 loss to Wichita State. As a sophomore, Daniels averaged 16.9 points, 5.3 rebounds and 3.3 assists per game, although Tulane finished 4–27. Following the season, he declared for the 2019 NBA draft and worked out for the Boston Celtics. Daniels ultimately opted to transfer to Villanova, citing a pickup game against Collin Gillespie as the deciding factor, and sat out the 2019–20 season as a redshirt.

In early January 2021, Daniels was one of two Villanova players who tested positive for COVID-19, forcing the program to shut down for two weeks. He averaged 9.6 points, 2.2 rebounds and 1.2 assists per game as a redshirt junior. In April 2021, Daniels was diagnosed with myocarditis and was instructed to avoid most basketball activities. Over the summer, he only practiced free throw shooting and his heart was monitored. By September, no abnormalities were detected by MRIs and stress tests, and Daniels was cleared to resume normal basketball activities. In part due to lack of conditioning, he was relegated to a sixth man role going into the season. On March 1, 2022, Daniels scored 20 points in a 76–74 win against ninth-ranked Providence.

Career statistics

College

|-
| style="text-align:left;"| 2017–18
| style="text-align:left;"| Tulane
| 30 || 0 || 18.3 || .429 || .396 || .800 || 2.2 || 1.5 || .2 || .3 || 6.4
|-
| style="text-align:left;"| 2018–19
| style="text-align:left;"| Tulane
| 30 || 30 || 33.9 || .445 || .346 || .687 || 5.3 || 3.3 || .8 || .3 || 16.9
|-
| style="text-align:left;"| 2019–20
| style="text-align:left;"| Villanova
| style="text-align:center;" colspan="11"|  Redshirt
|-
| style="text-align:left;"| 2020–21
| style="text-align:left;"| Villanova
| 25 || 24 || 25.8 || .414 || .386 || .792 || 2.2 || 1.2 || .4 || .0 || 9.6
|- class="sortbottom"
| style="text-align:center;" colspan="2"| Career
| 85 || 54 || 26.0 || .434 || .370 || .732 || 3.3 || 2.0 || .5 || .2 || 11.1

Personal life
Daniels is the youngest of three sons of Connie and Roland Daniels. His oldest brother R. J. played basketball at Xavier University of Louisiana, while older brother Marcel played at Dillard University before transferring to Southern University at New Orleans.

References

External links
Villanova Wildcats bio
Tulane Green Wave bio

1999 births
Living people
American men's basketball players
Basketball players from New Orleans
Shooting guards
St. Augustine High School (New Orleans) alumni
Tulane Green Wave men's basketball players
Villanova Wildcats men's basketball players